Kangerlussuaq Fjord (old spelling: Kangerdlugssuaq) is a long fjord in the Qeqqata municipality in central-western Greenland. It is the longest fjord of western Greenland.

Geography 

Another, smaller waterway connects to the sea to the north of the island.

Kangerlussuaq Fjord does not have any tributary fjords, with a fairly uniform coastline. Small hills of the Kangaamiut dike swarm, such as the highlands of Tarajornitsut, dominate the coast of the inner parts of the fjord, transforming into steep mountain ranges towards the mouth. In that it is different from fjords of Norway, or indeed many other fjords in Greenland, the coast of which is flanked by progressively smaller mountains.

Alluvial sediments from Qinnguata Kuussua, which carries meltwater from the ice sheet give rise to a distinct emerald coloring of the fjord waters for several kilometers from the fjord head. Silt accumulation at the estuary formed patches of quicksand of variable size up to a kilometer into the fjord.

This fjord marks the border between the two geographic regions of Queen Ingrid Land and King Frederick IX Land.

Settlement 

The only settlement on the shores of the fjord is Kangerlussuaq, located just north of the river estuary at the head of the fjord.

Transport 
The fjord is navigable in its entire length. Cruise ships, such as Norway's Hurtigruten and supply ships of Royal Greenland navigate the fjord, mooring at the Kangerlussuaq port, west of Kangerlussuaq Airport.

References

External links

Davis Strait
Fjords of Greenland
Kangerlussuaq